Fatemeh Jazini (born c. 1966) is a conservative (principlist) female member of the Iranian parliament (Islamic Consultative Assembly) representing Karaj, near Tehran. She is Rapporteur of the Majlis Women Faction. In 2009, Ajorlou was Mahmoud Ahmadinejad's candidate for Ministry of Welfare and Social Security, but was voted down by Majlis of Iran on September 3, 2009, with 76 favoring, 181 opposing, and 29 abstaining votes.

Education
Ajorlou is a PhD student of psychology.

Politics
Fatemeh Ajorlou has criticised the practice of "temporary marriages" despite support for them from interior minister, Mostafa Pour Mohammadi. She has said Iran’s 70-year-old Civil Code creates problems for the female population. She supported establishment of counseling centers in family courts to provide people with legal and cultural advice, and to help reduce the divorce rate.

In 2004, she addressed a two-day World Summit to Support Children's Rights in Rome, expressing opposition to abortion and supporting children's rights, particularly in occupied countries such as Iraq, Afghanistan and Palestine.

See also 
 Alireza Abbasi

References

21st-century Iranian women politicians
21st-century Iranian politicians
1966 births
Living people
Year of birth uncertain
Members of the Women's fraction of Islamic Consultative Assembly
Islamic Azad University alumni
Members of the 8th Islamic Consultative Assembly
Deputies of Karaj, Fardis, Eshtehard and Asara
Alliance of Builders of Islamic Iran politicians
Coalition of the Pleasant Scent of Servitude politicians